Felchville is a populated place in the town of Reading, Windsor County, Vermont, United States.

History
Felchville was named for businessman William Felch. A post office called Felchville operated from 1830 until 1922.

References

Populated places in Windsor County, Vermont
1830 establishments in Vermont
Reading, Vermont